is a four-way junction station of West Japan Railway Company (JR West) in Kizugawa, Kyoto, Japan. Although the station is on the junction of three lines: the Nara Line, the Katamachi Line, and Kansai Main Line as of rail infrastructure, it is served by the Nara Line, the Gakkentoshi Line, and the Yamatoji Line in terms of passenger train services. Most of the Gakkentoshi Line train service terminates here, while some of it extends through the Nara Line to Nara Station. It has the station numbers "JR-Q38" (Yamatoji Line), "JR-D19" (Nara Line) and "JR-H18" (Gakkentoshi Line).

Layout
The station consists of four tracks and two island platforms. The platforms are connected by an overpass.

Platforms

History 
Station numbering was introduced in March 2018 with Kizu being assigned station number JR-D19 for the Nara Line, JR-H18 for the Gakkentoshi Line, and JR-Q38 for the Yamatoji Line.

Passenger statistics
According to the Kyoto Prefecture statistical report, the average number of passengers per day is as follows.

Surrounding area
Kizugawa City Hall
Yamashiro Public Hospital
Kizu Central Library
Kizugawa River
Kizu Police Station (Kyoto Prefecture)

Nara-Kyoto Prefectural Route 47
Kyoto Prefectural Road 323
Kyoto Prefectural Kizu High School

See also
 List of railway stations in Japan

References

External links

  

Railway stations in Kyoto Prefecture
Railway stations in Japan opened in 1896